Legislative assembly is the name given in some countries to either a legislature, or to one of its houses.

The name is used by a number of countries, including member-states of the Commonwealth of Nations and other countries.  It is also used by their sub-national divisions, such as the Indian states and union territories, Australian states and Canadian provinces.

Legislative assemblies in the Commonwealth
Legislative assemblies in modern-day Commonwealth countries, either as national or sub-national parliaments, are in most cases an evolution of one of the legislative chambers of the previous colonial parliaments, whether the full legislature or a lower house.  In a number of jurisdictions, the name House of Assembly is used instead. It is one of the main names used in everyday speech for parliament in many countries.

Australia
The lower houses of the parliaments of the Australian states are called Legislative Assemblies. In South Australia and Tasmania, they are referred to as the House of Assembly. The only state with a sole chamber is the state of Queensland as it has abolished the former Legislative Council (upper house) of its parliament, leaving the Legislative Assembly as the sole chamber. There has been a push to reinstate the Legislative Council (upper house) in Queensland to be in line with other states. The parliaments of the Australian territories only have a sole chamber like Queensland, which is the Legislative Assembly. The unicameral legislature of the Australian Capital Territory is the Australian Capital Territory Legislative Assembly. Members of the Legislative Assembly/House of Assembly are referred to as MLAs (NSW, VIC, QLD, WA, ACT, NT) or MHAs (SA, TAS).

Canada

In Canada, seven of the ten provinces and all three of the territories style their legislatures as legislative assemblies.  All are unicameral. Manitoba was the first to abolish its Legislative Council in 1876. British Columbia and Newfoundland and Labrador abolished their Councils before becoming provinces. There was no Council for Alberta when it was created in 1905.
The Legislative Assembly of Quebec was renamed the Quebec National Assembly as part of the abolition of the Legislative Council of Quebec on December 31, 1968.

India
In India, the lower house or only house of each constituent state are State legislative assemblies of India. The same name is also used for the only house of the legislatures for three of the Union territories, Delhi, Jammu and Kashmir and Puducherry. The upper house in  states with a bicameral legislature are State legislative councils of India. Members of the former are called MLAs, and those of the latter MLCs.

Other Commonwealth countries and British Overseas Territories
 State legislative assemblies of Malaysia 
 Legislative Assembly of Samoa
 Legislative Assembly of Tonga
 Legislative Assembly of the Falkland Islands

Former legislative assemblies
 In Mauritius, the unicameral parliament was known as the legislative assembly until 1992, when, following the establishment of a republic, it was renamed the National Assembly
 Legislative Assembly of Lower Canada (1791–1838)
 Legislative Assembly of Upper Canada (1791–1841)
 Legislative Assembly (British Guiana) (1961–1964)
 Central Legislative Assembly of British India–1947

Legislative assemblies outside the Commonwealth
Legislative Assembly is the name given to some national legislatures (or one of the houses of the national legislature) of the sovereign nations of:

 Plurinational Legislative Assembly of Bolivia
 Legislative Assembly of Costa Rica
 Legislative Assembly of El Salvador

Former assemblies include:

 National Legislative Assembly of Thailand (2014)
 National Legislative Assembly (South Sudan)
 Legislative Assembly of Kyrgyzstan
 Legislative Assembly of Revolutionary France

Legislative bodies of the United States include:
 North Dakota Legislative Assembly 
 Oregon Legislative Assembly
 Legislative Assembly of Puerto Rico

The legislatures of the States of Brazil are called "legislative assembly", as are the legislatures of the two insular autonomous regions of Portugal, Azores (the Legislative Assembly of the Azores) and Madeira (the Legislative Assembly of Madeira). In Mexico, the legislative branch of government of Mexico City is the Legislative Assembly of Mexico City.

The Legislative Assembly of Macau is the organ of the legislative branch of the Macau Special Administrative Region.

See also
 
 Council
 Legislative council
 House of Assembly
 Member of the Legislative Assembly

Commonwealth of Nations
Legislatures